Susannah Gunning, née Minifie (c. 1740 – 28 August 1800 London) was a British writer and novelist. She and her family were the centre of a society scandal in 1791 which revolved around a suitor for her daughter, Elizabeth Gunning.

Biography 
Susannah Gunning was one of at least two daughters of Reverend Dr. James Minifie. Her sister was Margaret Minifie. Not much is known about her life prior to the publication of her first novel in 1763. By this point, she lived in Fairwater, Somerset. On 8 August 1768, she married Captain John Gunning of the 65th Regiment of Foot, who distinguished himself at the Battle of Bunker Hill. He was described as leading a "dissolute" and morally-corrupt life. He was brother-in-law to the Duke of Argyll, and it is possible that the Duke aided his advancement in the military. Susannah and John Gunning had a daughter, novelist Elizabeth Gunning, born in 1767. 

Susannah attempted to advance her daughter through marriage, but this failed and resulted in a public family row in 1791 which Horace Walpole described as the "Gunninghiad".  Susannah and John Gunning each supported a different suitor for Elizabeth, and when Elizabeth chose her mother's preferred candidate they were both forced out of the family home. They were received by the Duchess of Bedford. Susannah Gunning responded to the feud, which included intrigue regarding a forged letter, with a letter to Duke of Argyll declaring her innocence. When no support came from any of their powerful relatives, Elizabeth and Susannah were forced to retreat to France and let the gossip die down. The Morning Post at the time recounted these events as the "public conversation of the town". The "Gunninghiad" prompted many satires from onlookers, one of which can be found in Nichols's Illustrations. 

After the family separation, John Gunning – who at this point was a General – was fined £5,000 for "criminal conversation" with the wife of his tailor. He subsequently moved to Naples with his mistress to avoid paying the damages to her husband. Despite his boasting about conquests of aristocratic women, he altered his will the day before his death in 1797, leaving £8,000 and his Ireland estate to Susannah Gunning and their daughter.

Susannah Gunning died in Down Street, London on 28 August 1800. She was buried in the north cloister at Westminster Abbey. She does not appear to have ever had an inscribed gravestone and it is not clear why she was buried there. An anonymous friend who wrote the foreword of her last novel, The Heir Apparent (1802), wrote that Gunning's "name [is] ever attended by the recollection of her virtues'", and "[h]er life, from her cradle to her grave, was a life of holiness". An obituary in The Gentleman's Magazine was more frank, claiming Gunning was "a lady well known, if not highly celebrated, in the republik of letters" whose works were "among the middling class of novels".

Literary career 
Throughout her career, Susannah Gunning wrote 13 novels, a long poem, and a defence of her daughter. She and her sister, Margaret Minifie, began their literary careers when they published by subscription their work Histories of Lady Frances S--- and Lady Caroline S--- in 1763. From 1764 to 1770, commercial publishers released Gunning's subsequent novels: Family Pictures (1764), The Picture (1766), Barford Abbey (1768), The Cottage (1769), The Hermit (1770). The tone and plot of these novels were consistent with popular themes of the time – largely young women marrying into aristocracy. Gunning ceased writing in 1768 with her marriage to John Gunning.

It is unlikely that Gunning wrote any fiction during her marriage: the one novel published during this time, The Count de Poland (1780), was most likely written by her sister Margaret Minifie. During the "Gunninghiad", Gunning wrote a letter to the Duke of Argyll which paints her daughter as a victim and describes her in a melodramatic tone akin to her novels. Despite this, it does not appear that many readers believed her side of the story.

Gunning published her next solo novel in 1783 after 15 years of marriage. At this time, Gunning's use of satire and autobiographical details increased throughout her writing. For example, in Coombe Wood (1783) the heroine does not marry her cousin despite loving him, which mirrors events which occurred during the "Gunninghiad". Gunning's poem Virginius and Virginia (1792) similarly contains autobiographical details with the theme that a father and child should not "be debar'd". Gunning's family affairs also inspired the contents of her novels Anecdotes of the Delborough Family (1792) and Memoirs of Mary (1793).

In 1796, Gunning's two novels did not portray her own life like previous works. Delves (1796) is a quixotic adventure of a young boy, and The Foresters (1796) is a translation from the French work. Gunning's final novels, Love at First Sight (1797) and Fashionable Involvements (1800) are novels of manners which rely on plot and stylised characters.

Gunning's novels achieved mild popularity and some ridicule for their tendency to be over-the-top with sentimental plots. Gunning's tendency to hyperbole prompted a contemporary writer to coin the term 'minific'. She often used Gothic language in narratives about family, hinting towards her own experience as a wronged mother who needed to money to care for her children.

Works
Barford Abbey (a Novel), 1767; Garland Pub., 1975, ; Lightning Source Inc, 2006, 
The cottage: a novel , H. Saunders, J. Potts, W. Sleater, 1775
Susannah Gunning, M. Minifie (Miss.) The Count of Poland, J. and R. Byrn for Messieurs Price, Whitestone, 1780

Anecdotes of the Delborough Family: a Novel, 2nd ed; London: Lane, 1792
Memoirs of Mary: a Novel, 3rd ed; London: Bell, 1794
Lord Fitzhenry, 1794
Fashionable Involvements: a Novel, 3rd ed; London: Longman and Rees, 1800
The Heir Apparent: a Novel , London: Ridgeway & Symonds, 1794; 
Love at First Sight: a Novel, London: Lowndes, 1797

References

External links
 
 "Essay on the work of Susannah Gunning" Nasreen Hussain, May 2001
 "Susannah Gunning", Oxford Biography
 
 
 

1740s births
1800 deaths
British women novelists
18th-century British novelists
18th-century British women writers
18th-century British writers